Agnidra ataxia is a moth in the family Drepanidae. It was described by Hong-Fu Chu and Lin-Yao Wang in 1988. It is found in Yunnan, China.

The length of the forewings is about 15 mm. Adults are similar to Agnidra fulvior, but the markings on the wings are less clear.

References

Moths described in 1988
Drepaninae
Moths of Asia